Chavadipalayam railway station is a station near Erode in Tamil Nadu, India.

Goods terminal
A goods terminal has been developed by a private sector company in this station. It has a facility to serve goods traffic of half rake/full rake inward and outward goods from locals through booking.

References

Railway stations in Erode district
Salem railway division